Sriferia oxymeris is a moth of the family Gelechiidae. It was described by Edward Meyrick in 1929. It is found in North America, where it has been recorded from Texas.

The wingspan is about 11 mm. The forewings are white, irregularly speckled with dark fuscous. The stigmata are minute, blackish, the plical rather obliquely before the first discal. The hindwings are light gray.

References

Moths described in 1929
Gelechiini